Stefania Constantini (born April 15, 1999) is an Italian curler from Cortina d'Ampezzo. She currently skips the Italian National Women's Curling Team. She has played in three World Championships (2018, 2021, and 2022), five European Championships (2017, 2018, 2019, 2021, and 2022), and the 2016 Winter Youth Olympics. She won a bronze medal at the 2017 European Curling Championships and a gold medal in mixed doubles at the 2022 Beijing Olympics.

Career
Constantini made her international curling debut at the 2016 Winter Youth Olympics in the mixed team as third for Luca Rizzolli. The team went 3–4 through the round robin but lost in a tiebreaker to Turkey's Oğuzhan Karakurt. She also competed in the mixed doubles event with British curler Callum Kinnear. The pair made it to the final eight, where they lost to China's Zhao Ruiyi and Norway's Andreas Hårstad.

Constantini was added to the Italian National Women's Curling Team for the 2017–18 season as the team's second. The team also consisted of skip Diana Gaspari, third Veronica Zappone, lead Angela Romei, and alternate Chiara Olivieri. The team's first international event of the season came at the 2017 European Curling Championships in St. Gallen, Switzerland. The team played well through the round robin and qualified for the playoffs over higher-ranked teams such as Russia's Anna Sidorova and Germany's Daniela Jentsch. After losing in the semifinal to Sweden's Anna Hasselborg, the Italian team upset Switzerland's Silvana Tirinzoni 7–6 to earn the bronze medal, Italy's third-ever medal in the women's event at the European Championships. Next, the Italian women's rink competed in the 2017 Olympic Qualification Event in attempts to earn a spot in the 2018 Winter Olympics in PyeongChang, South Korea. The team once again performed well at the event, finishing the round robin in first place with a 5–1 record. This gave them two opportunities to secure their spot in the Olympics. In the first qualification final, the Italian side gave up nine stolen points against China's Wang Bingyu, ultimately losing the game 11–4. They had a second opportunity to qualify for the Games against Denmark's Madeleine Dupont in the second qualification final. In a tight game, Denmark's Dupont scored one in the extra end to win 5–4 and earn the final spot in the Olympics, meaning Italy would miss out on the Games. The team had one more international event during the season with Constantini competing in her first World Curling Championship at the 2018 World Women's Curling Championship. Despite their prior success, Team Gaspari finished in last at the World Championship with a 2–10 record, only defeating Scotland's Hannah Fleming and Russia's Victoria Moiseeva. Still of junior age, Constantini also skipped the Italian Junior Women's Team at the 2018 World Junior B Curling Championships, finishing in fifth place with a 5–2 record.

With Diana Gaspari stepping away from the women's team, Constantini was promoted to third on the Italian rink, with Veronica Zappone taking over as skip for the 2018–19 season. Romei moved up to play second while Frederica Ghedina and Elena Dami were added at lead and alternate, respectively. The team remained in the A Division at the 2018 European Curling Championships but finished in last with a 2–7 record. This relegated Italy to the B Division for the 2019 event, meaning they wouldn't qualify for the 2019 World Women's Curling Championship. Despite their result, Constantini was still of junior age and once again skipped the Italian women's rink at the 2019 World Junior-B Curling Championships. Her team finished with a 3–3 record, not enough to advance to the final eight playoff round. Two months later, in March 2019, Constantini skipped Team Italy at the 2019 Winter Universiade where her team finished in last with a 2–7 record.

By finishing last at the 2018 edition, the Zappone rink was relegated to the B Division of the 2019 European Curling Championships, where they would need to finish in the top two to promote themselves back into the A Division and earn a spot in the 2020 World Qualification Event. Through the round robin, the team suffered two defeats en route to a second-place finish in the group, only behind Turkey's Dilşat Yıldız who handed the Italian's one of their two losses. Team Zappone faced Hungary's Dorottya Palancsa in the semifinal and won the game 9–4, earning themselves a spot in the final where they would go against the Turkish side. The Italian's opened up a comfortable lead through the first five ends, which they rode to a 5–2 victory over Turkey and a gold medal in the B Division. Their win secured their spot in the World Qualification Event in January 2020, where two countries would qualify for the 2020 World Women's Curling Championship. The team finished 6–1 through the round robin, only losing to the unbeaten South Korean team of Gim Un-chi. They then faced Gim's rink in the first qualification game, where South Korea made a comeback in the second half of the game to beat the Italians 6–5. They then faced Yıldız's Turkish rink in the second qualification game for the final spot in the World Championship, which they won 8–4. Unfortunately, the World Championship was cancelled due to the COVID-19 pandemic. In her last year of junior eligibility, Constantini's junior rink finished the 2019 World Junior-B Curling Championships with a 5–1 record.

Due to the pandemic, the European Curling Championships were canceled. As a result, the field for the 2021 World Women's Curling Championship was expanded to fourteen teams as many countries did not have the opportunity to qualify for the Championship. Based on their success at the 2020 World Qualification Event, the Italian women's team earned the fourteenth and final spot in the championship. Constantini moved up to skip the Italian team which also included third Marta Lo Deserto, second Angela Romei, lead Giulia Zardini Lacedelli and alternate Elena Dami. The team finished in thirteenth place at the Championship with a 2–11 record, defeating Estonia's Marie Turmann and Germany's Daniela Jentsch. In May 2021, Constantini teamed up with Amos Mosaner to compete in the 2021 World Mixed Doubles Curling Championship, Constantini's first time playing in the mixed doubles discipline since her appearance at the 2016 Winter Youth Olympics. Italy's results were unaffected by Constantini's lack of experience in the discipline, as the Italian duo won seven of their nine round robin games and qualified for the playoff round. By doing so, they also qualified Italy for the mixed doubles tournament of the 2022 Winter Olympics in Beijing, China, Italy's first time competing in the event as they missed out on qualification for the 2018 Winter Olympics. In the playoff round, Constantini and Mosaner faced Norway's Kristin Skaslien and Magnus Nedregotten in the quarterfinal round. The team couldn't overcome an early deficit and lost the match 7–5.

Constantini continued skipping the Italian women's team into the 2021–22 season. At the 2021 European Curling Championships in Lillehammer, Norway, she led her team to a 4–5 round robin record. This placed them sixth in the group, which was good enough to earn Italy a spot in the 2022 World Women's Curling Championship. In the sixth round robin draw, the team defeated Scotland's Eve Muirhead 8–7, being the only team to defeat the Scottish side as they went on to win the gold medal in the playoff round. In December 2021, the team traveled to Leeuwarden, Netherlands to compete in the 2021 Olympic Qualification Event, hoping to secure Italy a spot in the women's event at the Beijing Olympics. After eight draws, the Italian team sat in fourth place in the standings with a 4–3 record. They faced Muirhead's British side in their final round robin draw, with the chance to secure the fourth playoff spot. The team, however, would lose 8–1 to Team Muirhead, meaning Latvia earned the last playoff spot instead of them. Constantini still got to compete in the Olympics, however, in the mixed doubles discipline with Amos Mosaner because of their strong finish at the 2021 World Championship. The team entered the mixed doubles tournament as underdogs but rose to international fame with their strong play and team dynamics. Against a stacked field, the Italian pair finished the round robin with a perfectly unblemished 9–0 record, three games ahead of the second place Norway who were 6–3. This earned them a spot in the playoff round, where they easily defeated Sweden's Almida de Val and Oskar Eriksson to advance to the gold medal game. In the final, Constantini and Mosaner took on Norway's pair of Kristin Skaslien and Magnus Nedregotten, who were the team that knocked them out of the 2021 World Championship. The Italian team gave up a steal of two in the first end but quickly found their footing with six points in the next three ends. Leading 7–5 in the eighth and final end, Constantini secured the gold medal for Italy with a double takeout to count a single point and win the game 8–5. It was Italy's first ever medal in curling at the Olympics, and first medal of any color won at an Olympic or World Championship event. Back with her women's team, Constantini led her rink to a 4–8 tenth-place finish at the World Women's Championship, defeating the Czech Republic, Norway, Scotland, and Turkey.

Personal life
Constantini is employed by the Gruppo_Sportivo_Fiamme_Oro, the sports team of the Italian national police force, since 2022.

Grand Slam record

Teams

References

http://oqe.curlit.com/aspnet/teamDetail.aspx?EventID=2&TeamID=24

External links

1999 births
Living people
Italian female curlers
People from Cortina d'Ampezzo
Sportspeople from the Province of Belluno
Curlers at the 2016 Winter Youth Olympics
Competitors at the 2019 Winter Universiade
Curlers at the 2022 Winter Olympics
Olympic curlers of Italy
Olympic gold medalists for Italy
Olympic medalists in curling
Medalists at the 2022 Winter Olympics
21st-century Italian women